The 2006–07 Czech Cup was the fourteenth season of the annual football knock-out tournament of the Czech Republic. It began on 22 July 2006 with the preliminary round and concluded with the final on 24 May 2007. The competition offered a place in the second qualifying round of the 2007–08 UEFA Cup for the winner; however since winners Sparta Prague qualified for the Champions League through the Czech First League this season, the place went to Jablonec 97 as runners-up.

Teams

Preliminary round
The preliminary round took place on 22 July 2006.

|}

Round 1
The first round was played on 29 July 2006.

|}

Round 2
The second round was played on 3 August 2006.

|}

Round 3
The third round was played on 20 September 2006.

|}

Round 4
The fourth round was played on 25 October 2006.

|}

Quarterfinals
The quarterfinals were played on 25 April 2007.

|}

Semifinals
The semifinals were played on 16 and 17 May 2007.

|}

Final

See also
 2006–07 Czech First League
 2006–07 Czech 2. Liga

References

External links
 Official site 
 Czech Republic Cup 2006/07 at RSSSF.com

2006-07
2006–07 domestic association football cups
Cup